Chester F. Gannon (April 19, 1888 – January 17, 1963) was a United States Republican politician.

Gannon was born in Truckee, California, and served in the United States Army during World War I.  He was a member of the California state legislature and in 1940 was a member of the Assembly Investigating Committee on Interference With the Legislature.

References

1888 births
United States Army personnel of World War I
Republican Party members of the California State Assembly
1963 deaths
20th-century American politicians